EF or ef may refer to:

Arts and entertainment 
 Ef (band), a post-rock band from Sweden
 Ef: A Fairy Tale of the Two., a Japanese adult visual novel series by Minori, or its anime adaptations

Businesses and organizations
 Eagle Forum, an anti-feminist conservative interest group
 Earth First! movement, in environmentalism
 Eastern Fare, a music institution and production house in Bangalore, India
 EF Education First an international education organization
 The Elias Fund, a non-profit organization
 Far Eastern Air Transport (IATA code EF)

Linguistics 
 Ef (Cyrillic) (Ф, ф), a letter in the Cyrillic alphabet
 F, a Latin letter

Science

Biology and psychology
 Ejection fraction, in cardiovascular physiology
 Elongation factors, proteins that are important in protein synthesis
 Executive functions, a theorized cognitive system in psychology that controls and manages other cognitive processes

Physics
 Electric field, in physics
 Exafarad, an SI unit of electric capacitance
 Fermi energy or Fermi level (EF),  both concepts in quantum mechanics

Other sciences
 Ecological footprint, the measure of the demand the population has on the environment
 Enhanced Fujita scale (EF scale), an improved version of the Fujita scale used to rate the intensity of tornadoes
 Ice cap climate, which is abbreviated to EF in the Köppen climate classification

Technology
 Canon EF camera, a manual focus 35mm SLR
 Canon EF lens mount, Canon's auto-focus lens mount
 Entity Framework, an object-relational mapping (ORM) framework for the .NET Framework

Other uses
 Extraordinary Form, a phrase used to describe the Catholic liturgy of the 1962 Roman Missal
 Era Fascista, the Italian fascist calendar
 Extra fine, a condition of a coin
 Eurofurence, a furry convention in Berlin, Germany